Lenore Tawney (born Leonora Agnes Gallagher; May 10, 1907 – September 24, 2007) was an American artist known for her drawings, personal collages, and sculptural assemblages, who became an influential figure in the development of fiber art.

Early life and education 
One of five children born in Lorain, Ohio to Irish American parents Sarah Jennings and William Gallagher. She left home at age 20 and worked in Chicago as a proofreader while taking night courses at the Art Institute of Chicago.

In 1941 she married George Tawney, who died eighteen months later. After his death, she moved to Urbana, Illinois to be near his family and enrolled at the University of Illinois to study art therapy. Tawney's introduction to the tenets of the German Bauhaus school and the artistic avant-garde began in 1946 when she attended László Moholy-Nagy's Chicago Institute of Design. There she studied with cubist sculptor Alexander Archipenko and abstract expressionist painter Emerson Woelffer, among others, and in 1949, she studied weaving with Marli Ehrman. While living in Paris from 1949-1951, she traveled extensively throughout North Africa and Europe. In 1954, she studied with the distinguished Finnish weaver Martta Taipale at Penland School of Crafts and began working tapestry and introduced a new palette into her work.

Career 
In 1957, she moved to New York City, where she became associated with a generation of Minimalist artists including Ellsworth Kelly, Robert Indiana, Agnes Martin and Jack Youngerman.

In 1961, Tawney's first solo exhibition, which included forty weavings she had produced since 1955, opened at the Staten Island Museum That year, she also pioneered an "open reed" for her loom in order to produce more mutable woven forms. Throughout the 1960s Tawney created drawings, postcard collages, and college and box forms and she combined collage and woven works. After 1977 she "...developed a series of architecturally scaled 'clouds', composed of thousands of shimmering linen threads suspended from canvas supports..." From the late 1950s up until her death in 2007, Tawney lived and worked mainly in New York City, traveling abroad frequently. "The first hundred years", she said with a smile on her hundredth birthday, "were the hardest."

Widely known in the New York art world and beyond, she was the veteran of more than two dozen solo exhibitions in leading galleries and museums and she participated in dozens of important group exhibitions. The American Craft Museum (New York City), the Art Institute of Chicago, the Cleveland Museum of Art, the Honolulu Museum of Art, the Metropolitan Museum of Art, the Neuberger Museum of Art (Purchase, New York), the Renwick Gallery (Washington, D.C.), and the Stedelijk Museum Amsterdam are among the Tawney public collections. Lenore Tawney: A Retrospective: American Craft Museum was published in 1990 by Rizzoli, and Lenore Tawney: Signs on the Wind, Postcard Collages was published by Pomegranate in 2002.

Artwork

Fiber
Tawney began weaving in 1954. Her early tapestries combined traditional with experimental, using an ancient Peruvian gauze weave technique and inlayed colorful yarns to create a painterly effect that appeared to float in space. Because of her unorthodox weaving methods, Tawney was spurned by both the craft and art worlds, but her distinct style attracted many devoted admirers. She is considered to be a groundbreaking artist for the elevation of craft processes to fine art status, two communities which were previously mutually exclusive.

Tawney's weavings fall into three categories: the solid straight weaving, the open warp weave, and the mesh or screen woven as background for solid areas. Tawney often went beyond traditional definitions of weaving, including needlework to add action to the line of a woven design. Furthering her experimentation, Tawney began creating what she called "woven forms". These totem-like sculptural weavings abandoned the rectangular format of traditional tapestries, and were suspended from the ceiling off the wall. She sometimes incorporated found objects such as feathers and shells into these pieces.

Drawing
Beginning in 1964 Lenore Tawney began a series of linear drawings using ink on graphing paper. This eight piece collection would go on to inspire the 1990s series  Drawings in Air, a three dimensional study of lines as threads in space. Tawney suspends threads in space with the help of plexiglass and wood framing.

Collage
In conjunction with her drawing series Tawney began a number of collage works. The artist utilized antique book pages, envelopes, and postcards as a working surface to which she liberally applied imagery, text, and drawing. These works contained a variety of messages, some  secret to humorous messages. The artist sent collages to friends and eventually created a series of collage books along with other items.

Assemblage

In 1964, Tawney began creating mixed media assemblages of small found objects including feathers, twigs, pebbles, string, bones, wood, and pages from rare books. These delicate, poetic pieces were often spiritual in nature, containing elusive messages about finding inner peace and the fragility of life. She continued to collect and assemble these pieces until her death in 2007, aged 100. Her assemblage Crow Woman from 1993, in the collection of the Honolulu Museum of Art, demonstrates the artist's delicate spiritual approach.

Exhibitions

Solo exhibitions
 Lenore Tawney, 1961, Staten Island Museum, New York, text by James Coggin and Agnes Martin.
 Lenore Tawney, 1975, California State University, Fullerton, text by Dextra Frankel, Bernard Kester, and Katharine Kuh.
 Lenore Tawney: A Personal World, 1978, Brookfield Craft Center, Connecticut, preface and interview  with Lenore Tawney by Jean d'Autilia.
 Lenore Tawney, 1979, New Jersey State Museum, Trenton, text by Katharine Kuh and Leah P. Sloshberg.
 Lenore Tawney: A Retrospective, 1990, American Craft Museum and Rizzoli International Publications, New York, edited by Kathleen Nugent Mangan, foreword by Katharine Kuh, text by Erika Billeter, Kathleen Nugent Mangan, and Paul J. Smith.
 Lenore Tawney, 1996, Stedelijk Museum, Amsterdam, Netherlands, foreword by Rudi Fuchs, text by Liesbeth Crommelin and Kathleen Nugent Mangan.
 Lenore Tawney–Meditations: Assemblages, Collages, and Weavings, 1997, Michael Rosenfeld Gallery, New York, text by Judith E. Stein.
 Vestures of Water: The Work of Lenore Tawney, 1997, Allentown Art Museum, Pennsylvania, text by Kathleen Nugent Mangan.
 Lenore Tawney: Celebrating Five Decades of Work, 2000, browngrotta arts, Wilton, Connecticut, foreword by Kathleen Nugent Mangan, text by Sigrid Wortmann Weltge, notes by Lenore Tawney.
 Lenore Tawney: Drawings in Air, 2007, browngrotta arts, Wilton, Connecticut, text by Kathleen Nugent Mangan.
 Lenore Tawney: Wholly Unlooked For, 2013, Maryland Institute College of Art, Baltimore, Maryland and University of the Arts, Philadelphia, Pennsylvania, foreword by Kathleen Nugent Mangan, text by Sid Sachs, Warren Seelig, and T'ai Smith.
 Lenore Tawney: Mirror of the Universe, 2019, John Michael Kohler Arts Center, Sheboygan, Wisconsin, text by Karen Patterson, Kathleen Nugent Mangan, Glenn Adamson, Mary Savig, Shannon R. Stratton, and Florica Zaharia.

Group exhibitions
 Woven Forms, 1963, Museum of Contemporary Crafts, New York, introduction by Paul J. Smith, text by Ann Wilson.
 Wall Hangings, 1969, The Museum of Modern Art, New York, introduction by Mildred Constantine and Jack Lenor Larsen.
 Nine Artists/Coenties Slip, 1974, Whitney Museum of American Art Downtown Branch, New York.
 Fiberworks, 1977, Cleveland Museum of Art, foreword by Sherman E. Lee, preface by Edward B. Henning, text by Evelyn Svec Ward.
 Weich und Plastich: Soft-Art, 1979, Kunsthaus Zurich, Switzerland, foreword by Erika Billeter, text by Magdalena Abakanowicz, Erika Billeter, Mildred Constantine, Richard Paul Lohse, Willy Rotzler, and André Thomkins.
 Tracking the Marvelous, 1981, Grey Art Gallery and Study Center, New York University, text by John Bernard Myers.
 Craft Today: Poetry of the Physical, 1986, American Craft Council, New York, New York, text by Paul J. Smith and Edward Lucie-Smith.
 Fiber R/Evolution, 1986, Milwaukee Art Museum and University Art Museum, University of Wisconsin, Milwaukee, foreword by Jane Fassett Brite and Jean Stamsta, and John Perreault.
 The Eloquent Object, 1987, Philbrook Museum of Art, Tulsa, Oklahoma, edited by Marcia Manhart and Tom Manhart, text by George L. Aguirre, Jonathan L. Fairbanks, Penelope Hunter-Stiebel, Mary Jane Jacob, –Horace Freeland Judson, Ronda Kasl, Lucy L. Lippard, Marcia Manhart and Tom Manhart, John Perreault, Rose Slivka, and Edwin L. Wade.
 Fiber Concepts, 1989, Arizona State University Art Museum, Tempe, Arizona, text by Lucinda H. Gedeon.
 Revered Earth, 1990, Center for Contemporary Arts of Santa Fe, preface by Robert B. Gaylor, text by Diane Armitage, Suzi Gablik, Robert B. Gaylor, Dominique GW Mazeaud, and Melinda Wortz.
 Abstraction: The Amerindian Paradigm, 2001, Palais des Beaux-Arts, Brussels in association with IVAM (Institut Valencià d'Art Modern), Valencia, text by Mary Frame, Lucy Lippard, Cecilia de Torres, César Paternosto, and Ferdinán Valentín.
 Generations/Transformations: American Fiber Art, 2003, American Textile History Museum, Lowell, Massachusetts.
 Circa 1958: Breaking Ground in American Art, 2008, Ackland Art Museum, The University of North Carolina at Chapel Hill, foreword by Emily Kass, text by Roni Feinstein.
 Messages & Magic, 100 Years of Collage and Assemblage in American Art, 2008, John Michael Kohler Arts Center, Sheboygan, Wisconsin, text by Leslie Umberger.
 Retro/Prospective: 25+ Years of Art Textiles and Sculpture, 2012, browngrotta arts, Wilton, Connecticut, text by Lesley Millar, and Jo Ann C. Stabb.
 Art=Text=Art: Works by Contemporary Artists, 2013, online catalogue: © Fifth Floor Foundation
 Art & Textiles: Fabric as Material and Concept in Modern Art from Klimt to the Present, 2013, Kunstmuseum Wolfsurg, Hatje Cantz Verlag, Ostfildern and authors, edited by Markus Brüderlin.
 Thread Lines, 2014, The Drawing Center, New York, New York, text by Joanna Kleinberg Romanow.
 Fiber: Sculpture 1960–Present, 2014, Institute of Contemporary Art/Boston and Prestel Verlag, Munich, London, New York, edited by Jenelle Porter, text by Glenn Adamson, Sarah Parrish, Jenelle Porter, and T'ai Smith.
 Influence and Evolution: Fiber Sculpture…then and now, 2015, browngrotta arts, Wilton, Connecticut, edited by Rhonda Brown, text by Ezra Shales.

See also
 Fiber art
 Weaving

References

Further reading
 Patterson, Karen, ed. Lenore Tawney: Mirror of the Universe (U of Chicago Press, 2019) online review
 
 Lenore Tawney, an Innovator in Weaving, Dies at 100 by Holland Cotter September 28, 2007, New York Times

External links
 An interview with Lenore Tawney, conducted 1971 June 23, by Paul Cummings, for the Archives of American Art
 images of Tawney's work at MoMA

1907 births
2007 deaths
American textile artists
American centenarians
American people of Irish descent
People from Lorain, Ohio
Artists from New York City
20th-century American sculptors
20th-century American women artists
Women textile artists
Sculptors from New York (state)
Women centenarians
Fellows of the American Craft Council
21st-century American women